Donald Francis Henderson (10 November 1931 – 22 June 1997) was an English actor. He was known for playing both "tough guy" roles and authority figures, and is remembered for his portrayal of detective George Bulman between 1976 and 1987 in the popular Granada Television police drama series The XYY Man, Strangers, and Bulman, as priest Frank Kane in BBC drama The Paradise Club (1989–90), and as General Tagge in the first Star Wars film (1977). This last role also brought him attention from science fiction fans, and he later appeared in cult science fiction television series Red Dwarf and Doctor Who.

Biography
Henderson was born into a working-class family in Leytonstone, Essex, the son of a carpenter, and grew up in Epping. After completing his national service as a technician in the Royal Army Dental Corps, he served with Essex Constabulary, reaching the rank of detective sergeant in their CID, and worked as an insurance salesman. He did not become a professional actor until his thirties, when a friend dared him to audition for the Royal Shakespeare Company, with whom he subsequently performed from 1966 until 1972, going on to play many leading roles.

Henderson had two children, a son and a daughter, with his first wife Hilary, who died from a mysterious lung disease in 1977. He remarried in 1979; his second wife was the actress Shirley Stelfox, with whom he would appear professionally many times. He lived in his adopted home town of Stratford-upon-Avon for many years, where he was a familiar face to locals.

Career
Henderson is best remembered for his role as the fictional detective George Bulman. This character featured in three TV series: The XYY Man in the mid-1970s; the later Strangers that saw Bulman rise from Detective Sergeant to Detective Chief Inspector and, in 1985, the series Bulman saw George retired from the police and pursuing a career as a horologist. He also starred in the popular TV drama series Warship.

Henderson made little money from his role in Star Wars—£300 for one day of filming. He also missed out on a large sum for his copy of the Star Wars script:
"I have only once been recognised as having been in Star Wars, and that was when I was making a film in Los Angeles. Somebody in the hotel I was staying at offered me $2000 for my copy of the Star Wars script. As I growled at him in amazement, he took that as a refusal, or that he had offered too little and eventually went up to an offer of $5000! Sadly, as with all my used scripts, I had given it to my kids to scribble and draw on."

Death
Henderson was first diagnosed with throat cancer in 1980. He died of the disease in Warwick on 22 June 1997, aged 65, and was survived by his second wife and his children.

Filmography

Film

Television

Radio

 The Archers (1983) (Radio) ... Ben Warner

References

External links

 Don Henderson BFI

1931 births
1997 deaths
English male film actors
English male television actors
English male stage actors
People from Leytonstone
People from Epping
Deaths from cancer in England
20th-century English male actors
Male actors from Essex
Royal Army Dental Corps soldiers
British police officers